Medea's Dance of Vengeance is a composition (1955, Op. 23a) by the American composer Samuel Barber, derived from his earlier ballet suite Medea and loosely based on the play Medea by Euripides. Barber first created a seven-movement concert suite from this ballet (Medea, Op. 23), and five years later reduced this concert suite down to a single-movement concert piece using what he felt to be the strongest portions of the work. He originally titled it Medea's Meditation and Dance of Vengeance, but shortly before his death, he changed the title to simply Medea's Dance of Vengeance.

Instrumentation 
Dance of Vengeance is scored for a larger orchestra than either preceding version (ballet or concert suite), being made up of the following:

Woodwinds 
3 Flutes (3rd doubling Piccolo)
2 Oboes
English Horn
Clarinet in E♭
2 Clarinets in Bb (and A)
Bass Clarinet
2 Bassoons
Contrabassoon

Brass 
4 Horns in F
3 Trumpets in C
3 Trombones
Tuba

Percussion 
Timpani
Triangle
Cymbals
Side drum (without snares)
Tom-tom
Bass Drum
Tam-tam
Whip
Xylophone

Harp
Piano

Strings 
Harp
Violins I, II
Violas
Cellos
Double basses

Premiere 
The work was premiered on February 2, 1956, by the New York Philharmonic under the baton of Dimitri Mitropoulos. The concert suite was recorded by the New Symphony Orchestra, conducted by Barber.

References 

1955 compositions
Compositions by Samuel Barber
Works based on Medea (Euripides play)